Gazidari or Gazdari or Qazi Dari may refer to:
 Gazidari-ye Olya
 Gazidari-ye Sofla